Cuneolinidae is an extinct family of prehistoric foraminifera in the order Loftusiida, in the suborder Ataxophragmiina and superfamily Ataxophragmioidea.

Overview of genera 
 †Cuneolininae
 †Cuneolina
 †Palaeolituonella
 †Pseudotextulariella
Sabaudiinae
 †Sabaudia
Scythiolininae
 †Vercorsella
 †Histerolina
 †Scythiolina

References

External links 
 
 
 

Loftusiida
Prehistoric SAR supergroup families
Foraminifera families
Mesozoic life